William Graham Connare (December 11, 1911 – June 12, 1995) was an American prelate of the Roman Catholic Church. He served as Bishop of Greensburg from 1960 to 1987.

Biography

Early life 
William Connare was born on December 11, 1911, in the East End of Pittsburgh, Pennsylvania, one of three children of James J. and Nellie T. (O'Connor) Connare. His parents were Irish immigrants who immigrated to the United States from County Galway and County Kerry, respectively. James Connare worked as an engineer for Nabisco. William Connare was a first cousin once removed of Mother Mercedes O'Connor, who was the first sister recruited by Katherine Drexel into the order of the Sisters of the Blessed Sacrament and the first successor to Drexel. Connare remained very close to the Sisters of the Blessed Sacrament throughout his life.

In 1917, Connare enrolled at the newly opened St. Lawrence School. After graduating from Duquesne University Preparatory School, he studied at Duquesne University in Pittsburgh. He graduated from Duquesne in 1932, and then attended St. Vincent College in Latrobe, where he earned a Master's degree in 1934. He began his studies for the priesthood at St. Vincent Seminary.

Priesthood 
Connare was ordained a priest for the Diocese of Pittsburgh by Bishop Hugh C. Boyle on June 14, 1936. His first assignment was as a curate at St. Canice Parish in Pittsburgh. He was transferred to the Cathedral of St. Paul in Pittsburgh in 1937, where he remained for twelve years. In 1949, Connare was appointed administrator of St. Richard Parish, an African American parish in the Hill District. He became both pastor of St. Richard's and a domestic prelate in 1955.

At St. Richard's, Connare helped organize the Catholic Interracial Council of Pittsburgh in 1953. He was also a board member of the Urban League of Pittsburgh and the Pittsburgh branch of the National Association for the Advancement of Colored People (NAACP). In addition to his pastoral duties, Connare served as diocesan director of the Society for the Propagation of the Faith and as vicar for religious.

Bishop of Greensburg 
On February 23, 1960, Connare was appointed the second Bishop of Greensburg by Pope John XXIII. He received his episcopal consecration on May 4, 1960, from Archbishop Egidio Vagnozzi, with Archbishop John F. Dearden and Bishop Richard H. Ackerman serving as co-consecrators, at Blessed Sacrament Cathedral. He founded the diocesan newspaper, The Catholic Accent, in 1961 and presided over the first diocesan synod that same year. He also expanded educational programs in parishes and opened the diocesan office of Catholic Charities.

Between 1962 and 1965, Connare attended all four sessions of the Second Vatican Council in Rome. He addressed the Council on behalf of the American bishops on the subject of the Divine Office and breviary. Shortly before the close of the Council, he reorganized the diocesan liturgical commission and established committees to facilitate such reforms as the change of the language of Mass from Latin to English. His self-proclaimed greatest accomplishment was the renovation of Blessed Sacrament Cathedral, which was completed in 1972, so that it could accommodate the new liturgical reforms.

In 1980, Connare attended the funeral of Archbishop Óscar Romero in San Salvador, where 40 people were killed during a violent outbreak at the Mass. He also served as Episcopal Moderators of the National Catholic Committee on Scouting from 1961 to 1970 and was awarded the Silver Buffalo Award by the Boy Scouts of America in 1971.

Retirement and legacy 
After Connare reached the mandatory retirement age of 75, Pope John Paul II accepted his resignation as Bishop of Greensburg on January 20, 1987. Connare served as apostolic administrator of the diocese until the installation of his successor, Bishop Anthony G. Bosco, on June 30 of that year.

William Connare died at Westmoreland Regional Hospital in Greensburg as a result of complications from anemia on July 12, 1995, at age 83.

In August 2018, a Pennsylvania grand jury revealed that there were numerous reports of clerical sex abuse of minors in the diocese  during Connare's tenure as bishop.

References

External links
 The Silver Buffalo Award

1911 births
1995 deaths
Roman Catholic Diocese of Pittsburgh
20th-century Roman Catholic bishops in the United States
Roman Catholic bishops of Greensburg
Participants in the Second Vatican Council
Catholics from Pennsylvania